The Fourth Philippine Legislature was the meeting of the legislature of the Philippine Islands under the sovereign control of the United States from October 16, 1916, to March 8, 1919.

Sessions
First Regular Session: October 16, 1916– February 8, 1917
First Special Session: February 12 – 22, 1917
Second Regular Session: October 16, 1917 – February 8, 1918
Second Special Session: September 30 – October 2, 1918
Third Regular Session: October 7, 1918 – February 8, 1919
Third Special Session: March 1 – 8, 1919

Legislation
The Fourth Philippine Legislature passed a total of 204 laws (Act Nos. 2665 – 2868).

Leadership

Senate
President of the Senate
Manuel L. Quezon (Nacionalista, Fifth District)

Majority Floor Leader:
Francisco F. Villanueva (Nacionalista, Seventh District)

House of Representatives
Speaker of the House of Representatives
Sergio Osmeña (Nacionalista, 2nd District Cebu)

Members

Senate 

Notes

House of Representatives

Notes

See also
Congress of the Philippines
Senate of the Philippines
House of Representatives of the Philippines

References

External links

Further reading
Philippine House of Representatives Congressional Library

04